Tragamin  is a village in the administrative district of Gmina Malbork, within Malbork County, Pomeranian Voivodeship, in northern Poland. The village has a small population of 501

Before 1772 the area was part of the Kingdom of Poland, in 1772-1919 it was part of Prussia and Germany, part of Free City of Danzig from 1920–1939, and from 1939 to February 1945 was under the rule of Nazi Germany. For the history of the region, see History of Pomerania.

References

Tragamin